Aum (or Om) is an Indian mantra and spiritual symbol.

AUM or aum may also refer to:

Art, entertainment, and media
 Audiological Medicine (SUAM), a peer-reviewed medical journal
 August Underground's Mordum, a 2003 exploitation film
 Aum!, a 2021 Indonesian adventure mockumentary film
 "Aum", a track from the album Asymmetry (2013) by the Australian band Karnivool
 AUM Fidelity, a jazz record label
 Aum (album)
 "A.U.M.", a track from the album Bleed the Future (2021) by the Canadian band Archspire

Education
 American University of Madaba, a private university in Jordan
 American University of Malta, a private liberal arts university in Malta
 Auburn University at Montgomery, a public university in Alabama

Other uses
 Animal unit month
 Anxiety/uncertainty management
 Assets under management
 Aum (unit), a UK unit for hock (German white wine)
 AUM, an alternate spelling for Um

See also
 Om (disambiguation)
 Um (disambiguation)
 Aum Shinrikyo, a Japanese new religious movement, known for carrying out the Sarin gas attacks in the Tokyo subways